Mattias Sjögren (born November 27, 1987) is a Swedish former professional ice hockey centre who last played for Rögle BK of the Swedish Hockey League (SHL).

Playing career
Undrafted, Sjögren played youth hockey in Sweden within Rögle BK. He made his professional debut in the HockeyAllsvenskan with Rögle BK, helping gain promotion to the Elitserien. He transferred to fellow top division club, Färjestad BK, for the 2010–11 season and won the Swedish championship with the club that year.

On June 1, 2011, Sjögren as a free agent to a two-year contract, reportedly worth 1.8 million dollars, with the Washington Capitals. In the 2011–12 season, after attending the Capitals training camp, he was assigned to AHL affiliate, the Hershey Bears. In November 2011, Sjögren elected to return to Sweden, allowable by his contract, after becoming displeased with the Capitals for not calling him up from the Hershey Bears for an extended period of time. General Manager George McPhee said, "When we signed him, we told him we had a job available and promised him we’d give him a look this year. His training camp wasn't good enough to keep him at the start of the year and he was developing OK, but I guess he got impatient and decided to go home. And if you’re going to quit on us you might as well go." On April 10, 2012, Sjögren however, was recalled from Sweden by the Capitals for the 2012 Stanley Cup Playoffs to be added to the practice squad.

After two largely unsuccessful seasons in North America within the Capitals organization and without seeing NHL action, Sjögren returned to the Swedish Hockey League (SHL), signing a three-year contract with Linköpings HC on May 16, 2013. He played two years with the Linköping team and received the Peter Forsberg Trophy as the SHL's best forward in the 2014-15 season before signing with Ak Bars Kazan of the KHL for the 2015-16 season.

On June 16, 2016, he signed a two-year contract with the ZSC Lions of the National League (NL). In his two seasons with the Lions, Sjögren was unable to make the desired impact, largely affected through injury, limiting him to just 19 games in the 2017–18 season.

On April 28, 2018, Sjögren as a free agent opted to return home to original club, Rögle BK of the SHL, agreeing to a four-year contract.

International play

Sjögren was a member of Sweden's silver-winning squad at the 2011 IIHF World Championship and won bronze at the 2014 IIHF World Championships.

Career statistics

Regular season and playoffs

International

References

External links

1987 births
Living people
Ak Bars Kazan players
Färjestad BK players
Hershey Bears players
Linköping HC players
Rögle BK players
People from Landskrona Municipality
ZSC Lions players
Swedish ice hockey centres
Sportspeople from Skåne County